Josette Baisse (born 11 September 1924) is a French cross-country skier during the 1950s. She finished 15th in the 10 km event at the 1952 Winter Olympics in Oslo.

Cross-country skiing results

Olympic Games

References

Olympic cross-country skiers of France
Cross-country skiers at the 1952 Winter Olympics
French female cross-country skiers
Living people
1924 births
20th-century French women